Piliscsaba is a town in Budapest metropolitan area, Hungary, located in northwestern Pest County, near the border of Komárom-Esztergom in a valley between the Buda and Pilis hills. It is accessible by Highway 10 and lies on the Budapest-Esztergom rail line,  from the center of Budapest. The surrounding hills are  meters high.

Unemployment is about 4%, and a large proportion of the population commutes to Budapest (mostly for work or school).

The town is surrounded by forested hills: hills of the Pilis Mountains to the north and hills of the Budai Mountains to the south. Faculty of the Pázmány Péter Catholic University (at the Eastern gate of the city) is built on the site of former Soviet barracks (previously Hungarian barracks).

Imre Makovecz, a Hungarian architect designed a famous building called the Stephaneum in the city.

The 11th International Congress for Finno-Ugric Studies was held in Piliscsaba during 9–14 August 2010.

Twin towns — sister cities
Piliscsaba is twinned with:

  Möckmühl, Germany (2004)
  Veľký Lapáš, Slovakia (2004)
  Cherasco, Italy (2005)
  Valea Seacă, Romania

References

See also 
 Csaba

Populated places in Pest County
Hungarian German communities